"Rush" is a song by Nigerian singer Ayra Starr, released as her debut single on 16 September 2022 by Mavin Records and taken from Starr's debut studio album 19 & Dangerous.

It charted worldwide in 2023 after going viral on TikTok, so far peaking at number 29 in the UK, and in the top 40 in Switzerland and the Netherlands. Prior to the song's success, Starr was cited by NME as one of their artists to watch in 2022, describing how she "varies her afro-pop sound perfectly by mixing in hints of R&B or trappy hit-hats".

Charts

Release history

References

2022 debut singles
2021 songs
Mavin Records singles